Madrasa of Zawiya El Bokria is one of the madrasahs of the medina of Tunis.

History 
It was built during the Hafsid dynasty. The name of this madrasa come from Abou Bakr, one of the descendants of Uthman.

It contains a madrasa and a mausoleum, which is the same at Madrasa Marjania.

El Bokri Family 

References 

Zawiya